The 2023–2024 AVC Beach Volleyball Continental Cup is a beach volleyball double-gender event for teams representing Asian countries. The winners of the event will qualify for the 2024 Summer Olympics.

Men

Preliminary round

Central Asia
Host: Cox's Bazar, Bangladesh

Eastern Asia
Host: TBD

Oceania
Host: Port Vila, Vanuatu

Southeastern Asia

Western Asia
Host: Doha, Qatar

  advanced to the final round.
  advanced to the semifinal round.

Semifinal round
Host: TBD

Final round
Host: TBD

  (Defending champions)
  (Western Asia)

Women

Preliminary round

Central Asia
Host: Cholpon-Ata, Kyrgyzstan

Eastern Asia
Host: TBD

Oceania
Host: Port Vila, Vanuatu

Southeastern Asia

Western Asia
Host: Doha, Qatar

  advanced to the final round.
  advanced to the semifinal round.

Semifinal round
Host: TBD

Final round
Host: TBD

  (Defending champions)
  (Western Asia)

References

External links
Official website

Continental Beach Volleyball Cup
2023 in beach volleyball
2024 in beach volleyball